Robert J. Del Tufo (November 18, 1933 – March 2, 2016) was an American prosecutor. He was the Attorney General of New Jersey from 1990 to 1993.

Biography
Del Tufo was born in 1933 in Newark, New Jersey, to Raymond and Mary Del Tufo. His older brother, Raymond Del Tufo, Jr., later served as U.S. Attorney for the District of New Jersey. He graduated from the Newark Academy and received a BA degree in 1955 from Princeton University. He received his LLB degree from Yale Law School in 1958. From 1958 to 1960, he served as legal secretary to Chief Justice Joseph Weintraub of the New Jersey Supreme Court. He was admitted to the New Jersey Bar in 1959 and practiced law in Morristown, New Jersey, from 1960 to 1974, and in Newark, New Jersey, from 1980 to 1986.

He served as an assistant prosecutor in Morris County from 1963 to 1965 and as first assistant prosecutor there from 1965 to 1967. Del Tufo held the position of U.S. Attorney for the District of New Jersey from 1977 until resigning in 1980. He sought the Democratic nomination for Governor of New Jersey in 1985, losing in the primary to Essex County executive Peter Shapiro, who in turn lost to Thomas Kean in the general election. He was sworn in as Attorney General on January 16, 1990, the day of Governor James Florio's inauguration, resigning in 1993 to join the New York City firm Skadden, Arps, Slate, Meagher & Flom.

On March 5, 1994, Del Tufo married Katherine Nouri Hughes, vice president of communications for the Milken Family Foundation. She was previously married to Emmet John Hughes, a journalist and aide to President Dwight D. Eisenhower.

In February 2006, Governor Jon Corzine appointed Del Tufo Chairman the Board of Trustees of the University of Medicine and Dentistry of New Jersey.

He died on March 2, 2016, of lung cancer. Del Tufo had been a resident of Morris Township, New Jersey.

References

External links
Official bio, Office of the Attorney General of New Jersey. Accessed March 20, 2008.

1933 births
2016 deaths
People from Morris Township, New Jersey
Politicians from Newark, New Jersey
Princeton University alumni
Yale Law School alumni
New Jersey Attorneys General
United States Attorneys for the District of New Jersey
New Jersey lawyers
New York (state) lawyers
Lawyers from Newark, New Jersey
Skadden, Arps, Slate, Meagher & Flom people
20th-century American lawyers